Anthony Ernest Oppenheimer (born June 1937) is a British diamond dealer and racehorse owner.

Early life
He was born in June 1937, the son of Sir Philip Oppenheimer, and his wife Pamela Fenn Stirling.

Career
Oppenheimer was president of De Beers Group.

Racehorse owner
Oppenheimer owns Golden Horn, who won the 2015 Epsom Derby and Cracksman who won the 2017 Champion Stakes.

Major wins as an owner 
Great Britain
 British Champions Fillies and Mares Stakes - Star Catcher (2019)
 Champion Stakes - (2) - Cracksman (2017, 2018)
 Coronation Cup - (1) - Cracksman (2018)
 Coronation Stakes - (2) - Rebecca Sharp (1997), Balisada (1999)
 Eclipse Stakes - Golden Horn (2015)
 Epsom Derby - Golden Horn (2015)

France
 Prix de l'Arc de Triomphe - Golden Horn (2015)
 Prix d'Ispahan - Sasuru (1997)
 Prix Ganay - Cracksman (2018)
 Prix Vermeille - Star Catcher (2019)

Ireland
 Irish Champion Stakes - Golden Horn (2015)
 Irish Oaks - Star Catcher (2019)

Personal life
Oppenheimer married Penny Barker in 1965, but they divorced in 1983, following her affair with Captain Fred Barker, a Singer sewing machine heir.

They had three daughters, Sophie, Emily and Arabella. 

He later married Antoinette Oppenheimer.

References

1937 births
British businesspeople
British racehorse owners and breeders
Living people
Anthony
Owners of Epsom Derby winners
Owners of Prix de l'Arc de Triomphe winners